Heydarabad-e Olya (also Romanized as Ḩeydarābād-e ‘Olyā) is a village in Ludab Rural District, Ludab District, Boyer-Ahmad County, Kohgiluyeh and Boyer-Ahmad Province, Iran. At the 2006 census, its population was 430, in 88 families.

References 

Populated places in Boyer-Ahmad County